Eggberg is a mountain of Baden-Württemberg, Germany.

External links

Mountains and hills of Baden-Württemberg